The Legend of Heroes: Trails in the Sky the 3rd is a 2007 role-playing video game developed by Nihon Falcom. The game is a part of the Trails series, itself a part of the larger The Legend of Heroes series, and serves as the final entry in the Trails in the Sky arc.

Trails in the Sky the 3rd first released in Japan for Windows and later for the PlayStation Portable. It did not see an English release until 2017 due to the game's large amount of text necessary to translate. A port to the PlayStation 3 was released in 2013, while a remaster for the PlayStation Vita was released in 2016; both were only released in Japan.

Gameplay
The game plays similarly to its predecessors, being a role-playing video game with turn-based battles, but this time enemies have affinities to the three higher elements of time, space and mirage. Other additions are the turn bonuses of "rush", allowing the player to take two actions at once, "guard", which nullifies any damage, "vanish", which makes a target disappear for a few turns, and "death", which gives the attack the effect of an instant death. Throughout the games' dungeons the player will find doors engraved with symbols of the moon, stars and the sun, which trigger, respectively, long story scenes, short story scenes, and mini-games. Those scenes usually tell the story of past events and may feature battles.

Save data from the Windows, PSP, and PS3 versions of Second Chapter unlock bonus content when playing the 3rd. Additionally, save data for the 3rd is transferable from the PSP to the PS3, allowing the player to continue where they had left off.

Plot
The game follows Septian Church secret agent Kevin Graham, who is sent to an otherworldly dimension known as Phantasma. Other characters from the series are similarly summoned to Phantasma, and Kevin works with them to investigate the realm and how to escape it, coming to terms with his past along the way. Sky the 3rd foreshadows several plot elements that are seen in later arcs.

Development
The Legend of Heroes: Trails in the Sky was initially planned to be released as one singular game, but the size and scope grew so much that Falcom had to either pare down the game, or split it up. They chose the latter, and eventually split it into two parts, First Chapter (FC) and Second Chapter (SC). Development later started on an epilogue, which became the 3rd. While the first two entries focused on the more upbeat adventures of Estelle and Joshua, the 3rd shifted its focus on telling a darker story following different protagonists.

After FC successful launch on Windows, Xseed Games showed renewed interest in localization of the 3rd, contingent on the success of SC. In 2013, Xseed partnered with translation company Carpe Fulgur to translate SC; the 3rd release largely hinged on its success. Ken Berry, vice president of Xseed Games, stated that despite having the right to release the 3rd, they would be willing to allow others to translate them as well due to them being such large undertakings.

Release
The Legend of Heroes: Trails in the Sky the 3rd was initially released in Japan for Windows on June 28, 2007. A port for the PlayStation Portable was released in Japan on July 24, 2008. A high definition port for the PlayStation 3 was released in Japan on June 27, 2013. A remaster, The Legend of Heroes: Trails in the Sky the Third Evolution, was released in Japan for the PlayStation Vita on July 14, 2016. An English localization of Trails in the Sky the 3rd by Xseed Games was released worldwide for Windows on May 3, 2017.

In 2011, publisher Aeria Games announced a mobile version of the Trails in the Sky games for North America, but no details have been released since the initial announcement. Xseed said that they had no connection to the potential Aeria Games release.

Reception

Trails in the Sky the 3rd received "generally favorable" reviews according to review aggregator Metacritic. Upon release in Japan, the PlayStation Portable version received a score of 30/40 from video game magazine Famitsu.

Notes

References

External links
 

2007 video games
Japanese role-playing video games
Nihon Falcom games
PlayStation 3 games
PlayStation Portable games
PlayStation Vita games
Post-traumatic stress disorder in fiction
Role-playing video games
Single-player video games
The Legend of Heroes
Trails (series)
Video game sequels
Video games developed in Japan
Windows games
Xseed Games games